Peter Caulitz (c.1650–1719)  was a German painter of landscapes and animals, especially domestic fowl. Born in Berlin, he studied in Italy, and was a court painter to Frederick the Great.

Life
Caulitz was born to poor parents in Berlin in about 1650. He served as a drummer in a regiment of dragoons before becoming an assistant to a young painter who took  him to Rome where he developed his skills as an artist.<ref
name=nacht/>

He was back in Berlin by 1681, and in 1695  was appointed court painter to  Frederick I of Prussia.  He made a second visit to Italy in the company of his fellow court painter, Samuel Theodor Gericke. He retained
his  post at court until his death in Berlin in 1719.

His work consists of landscapes, including views of Prussian royal castles, and pictures of animals, especially hens and turkeys. His animal paintings show the influence of the Dutch artists Melchior d'Hondecoeter and Jan Weenix. The Berlin Museum has a scene representing a poultry-yard by him; there are other examples at Potsdam and at Brunswick.

Caulitz also worked in mosaic and restored paintings. His widow continued the restoration business after his death.

References

Sources

External links

17th-century German painters
German male painters
18th-century German painters
18th-century German male artists
Artists from Berlin
Year of birth unknown
1719 deaths
Court painters
Year of birth uncertain